Badhër Castle (Albanian:Kalaja e Badhrës) is a castle in Borsh Albania. The castle is on the national road SH8 on the way to Piqeras. It located in the hill with the same name Badhër. On the left side of the hill you may see the ruins of medieval construction. On excavations during communism prehistoric tools were found.

References

Castles in Albania
Buildings and structures in Himara